Nemia Soqeta (born 4 March 1985) is a Fijian rugby union player. He was named in Fiji's squad for the 2015 Rugby World Cup.

He played for the French club Oyonnax in the Top 14. In 2016, Soqeta was named in the squad for the World Rugby Pacific Nations Cup. He played in the test match against Georgia, when Georgia toured the Pacific nations in their 2016 mid-year tour.

References

1985 births
Living people
Fijian rugby union players
US Dax players
Fiji international rugby union players
Sportspeople from Nadi
Rugby union locks